In mathematics, a Relevance Vector Machine (RVM) is a machine learning technique that uses Bayesian inference to obtain parsimonious solutions for regression and probabilistic classification.
The RVM has an identical functional form to the support vector machine, but provides probabilistic classification.

It is actually equivalent to a Gaussian process model with covariance function:

where  is the kernel function (usually Gaussian),  are the variances of the prior on the weight vector

Compared to that of support vector machines (SVM), the Bayesian formulation of the RVM avoids the set of free parameters of the SVM (that usually require cross-validation-based post-optimizations). However RVMs use an expectation maximization (EM)-like learning method and are therefore at risk of local minima. This is unlike the standard sequential minimal optimization (SMO)-based algorithms employed by SVMs, which are guaranteed to find a global optimum (of the convex problem).

The relevance vector machine was patented in the United States by Microsoft (patent expired September 4, 2019).

See also 
 Kernel trick
 Platt scaling: turns an SVM into a probability model

References

Software 
 dlib C++ Library
 The Kernel-Machine Library
 rvmbinary: R package for binary classification
 scikit-rvm
 fast-scikit-rvm, rvm tutorial

External links
Tipping's webpage on Sparse Bayesian Models and the RVM
A Tutorial on RVM by Tristan Fletcher
Applied tutorial on RVM
Comparison of RVM and SVM

Classification algorithms
Kernel methods for machine learning
Nonparametric Bayesian statistics